Catherine de' Ricci (23 April 1522 – 2 February 1590), was an Italian Dominican Tertiary sister. She is believed to have had miraculous visions and corporeal encounters with Jesus, both with the infant Jesus and with the adult Jesus. She is said to have spontaneously bled with the wounds of the crucified Christ. She is venerated for her mystic visions and is honored as a saint by the Catholic Church.

Life
She was born Alessandra Lucrezia Romola de' Ricci in the Manelli Palace in Florence to Pier Francesco de' Ricci, of a patrician banking family, and his wife, Caterina Bonza, who died soon after. At age 6 or 7, her father enrolled her in a school run by the Benedictine nuns of the monastery of San Pietro de Monticelli near their home, where her aunt, Luisa de' Ricci, was the abbess. She was a very prayerful person from a very young age. There she developed a lifelong devotion to the Passion of Christ. 

After a short time outside the monastery, at the age of thirteen she entered the Convent of St Vincent in Prato, Tuscany, a cloistered community of religious sisters of the Third Order of St. Dominic, disciples of the noted Dominican friar Girolamo Savonarola, who followed the strict regimen of life she desired. In May 1535 she received the religious habit from her uncle, Timoteo de' Ricci, who was confessor to the convent, and the religious name of Catherine, the name of her deceased mother.

De' Ricci's period of novitiate was a time of trial. She is reported to have been experienced visions of Mary and the baby Jesus. She would experience ecstasies during her routine, which caused her to lose asleep and seem dull during community prayer services, and clumsy dropping plates and food, so much so that the community began to question her competence, if not her sanity. Eventually the other Sisters became aware of the spiritual basis for her behavior. By the age of 25 she had risen to the post of prioress.

As the prioress, de' Ricci developed into an effective and greatly admired administrator. She was an advisor on various topics to princes, bishops and cardinals. She corresponded with three figures who were destined to become popes: Pope Marcellus II, Pope Clement VIII, and Pope Leo XI. An expert on religion, management and administration, her advice was widely sought. She gave counsel both in person and through exchanging letters. It is reported that she was extremely effective and efficient in her work, managing her priorities very well.

It is claimed that de' Ricci's meditation on the Passion of Christ was so deep that she spontaneously bled, as if scourged and bore the Stigmata. During times of deep prayer, like Catherine of Siena, her patron saint, a coral ring representing her marriage to Christ appeared on her finger.

It is reported that de' Ricci wore an iron chain around her neck and engaged in extreme fasting and other forms of penance and sacrifice, especially for souls in Purgatory.

One of the miracles that was documented for her canonization was her appearance many hundreds of miles away from where she was physically located in a vision to Philip Neri, a resident of Rome, with whom she had maintained a long-term correspondence. Neri, who was otherwise very reluctant to discuss miraculous events, confirmed the event.

De' Ricci lived in the convent until her death in 1590 after a prolonged illness. Her remains are visible under the altar of the Minor Basilica of Santi Vicenzo e Caterina de' Ricci, Prato, which is next to the convent associated with her life.

Veneration
De' Ricci was beatified by Pope Clement XII in 1732, and canonized by Pope Benedict XIV in 1746 in a spectacular ceremony for which a magnificent ‘apparato’ was constructed. In celebration of the saint's canonization, Domenico Maria Sandrini wrote an authoritative biography of the new saint. Her feast day falls on February 13.

See also
Incorruptibles
List of Catholic saints
Saint Catherine of Ricci, patron saint archive

References

External links
Catholic Encyclopedia: St. Catherine de Ricci

1522 births
1590 deaths
16th-century Christian mystics
Religious leaders from Florence
Dominican Sisters
Dominican mystics
16th-century Italian Roman Catholic religious sisters and nuns
16th-century Italian women writers
Burials in Tuscany
Italian Roman Catholic saints
16th-century Christian saints
Incorrupt saints
Stigmatics
Christian female saints of the Early Modern era
Canonizations by Pope Benedict XIV
Beatifications by Pope Clement XII